Robert Christopher Markosyan (born 14 August 1976) is a retired Iranian football player.

Club career
Having played for Saba Battery F.C. for a couple of seasons, in July 2006 he was transferred to Shirazi club Bargh, where he had a good season by scoring 10 goals in 27 appearances for the club. In August 2007 he joined Tehrani club Paykan, although he was linked with Pegah Gilan.

International career
In October 2006, he was called up to join Team Melli for an LG cup tournament held in Jordan.

References

1976 births
Living people
Iranian footballers
Association football forwards
Iran international footballers
Persian Gulf Pro League players
Bargh Shiraz players
Saba players
Paykan F.C. players
Iranian people of Armenian descent